The winners of the 1995 Asian Cup Winners' Cup, the association football competition run by the Asian Football Confederation, are listed below.

First round

West Asia

|}
1 AkMaral withdrew

East Asia

|}
1 Ratnam withdrew after 1st leg

Second round

West Asia

|}

East Asia

{{TwoLegResult|New Radiant|MDV|3–2|East Bengal Club'|IND|3–0|0–2}}

|}

Quarterfinals

West Asia

|}

East Asia

|}

Semifinals1 Riyadh SC withdrew''

Final

References
 RSSSF Asian Club Competitions 1995

Asian Cup Winners' Cup
2